Oviñana can refer to:

 Oviñana (Cudillero), parish in Cudillero, Asturias, Spain
 Oviñana (Sobrescobio), parish in Sobrescobio, Asturias, Spain